Wasserlosen is a municipality  in the Schweinfurt district, Bavaria, Germany. The villages in this municipality are:

Brebersdorf
Burghausen bei Schweinfurt
Greßthal
Kaisten
Rütschenhausen
Schwemmelsbach
Wasserlosen
Wülfershausen

References

External links

 

Schweinfurt (district)